Talalolae is an islet located in Nui atoll in the Pacific Ocean state of Tuvalu.

References

External links
Map of Nui showing Talalolae

Islands of Tuvalu
Nui (atoll)